Pavel Illyich Bulgakov (3 August 1856 – 1940) was an Imperial Russian division and corps commander. He fought in the war against the Ottoman Empire. He took part in the Russian invasion of East Prussia, a part of the German Empire. On 18 February 1915, his forces were surrounded the German Tenth Army in the Augustow Forest. On 21 February 1915 he and surviving men surrendered. This provided time for the rest of the Russian Tenth Army to form a new defensive position. Bulgakov was taken prisoner by the Germans and remained in captivity until after the Treaty of Brest-Litovsk. On 3 August 1918 he was released. He traveled by train to Mtsensk in Oryol Oblast, where he was hospitalized after arriving on 8 August 1918. On 6 September 1918 he went to Bălți, Bessarabia (now in Moldova, then controlled by Romania). He remained there for the duration of the Russian Civil War and after the Bolshevik victory. He died shortly after Bessarabia was annexed by the Soviet Union.

Awards
Order of Saint Stanislaus (House of Romanov), 3rd class, 1879
Order of Saint Vladimir, 3rd class, 1898
Order of Saint Stanislaus (House of Romanov), 1st class, 1905
Order of Saint Anna, 1st class, 1910
Order of Saint George, 4th degree (13 January 1915)
Order of the White Eagle (Russian Empire) (26 February 1915)

Sources
 Залесский К. А. Кто был кто в Первой мировой войне. М., 2003.
 Гущин Ф. А., Жебровский С. С. Пленные генералы Российской императорской армии 1914–1917. Русский путь. 2010.
 Волков С. В. Офицеры российской гвардии. М. 2002
 

1856 births
1940 deaths
Russian military personnel of the Russo-Turkish War (1877–1878)
Russian military personnel of World War I
Recipients of the Order of Saint Stanislaus (Russian), 3rd class
Recipients of the Order of St. Vladimir, 3rd class
Recipients of the Order of Saint Stanislaus (Russian), 1st class
Recipients of the Order of St. Anna, 1st class
Recipients of the Order of the White Eagle (Russia)